The Roberval and Saguenay Railway  is a small railway company, wholly owned by Rio Tinto Alcan, a mining corporation. 

It carries raw ore materials in portions of northern Quebec in eastern Canada. 

References

Quebec railways
Mining railways
Mining in Quebec
Rio Tinto (corporation) subsidiaries
Aluminum in Canada